Nidugunda  is a village in the southern state of Karnataka, India. It is located in the Chincholi taluk of Kalaburagi district.

Demographics
As of 2001 India census, Nidugunda had a population of 5775 with 2889 males and 2886 females.

See also
 Gulbarga
 Districts of Karnataka

References

External links
 http://Gulbarga.nic.in/

Villages in Kalaburagi district